Hudd Kar Di is an Indian television series. It is a sitcom that deals with a family living in the city.

Cast
 Dara Singh as Devender Singh Dhanwa/Papaji
 Rita Bhaduri as Kiran/Beeji
 Mahesh Thakur as Suraj Singh Dhanwa
 Shilpa Tulaskar as Namrata Dhanwa
 Swapnil Joshi as Neeraj Singh Dhanwa/Nikku (1999)
 Pallavi Kulkarni as Riya Dhanwa
 Kabir Sadanand as Kunal Malhotra (Riya's Husband)
 Sumeet Raghavan as Raju
 Kishori Godbole as Shobha
 Shehzad Khan as Pathan
 Sachin Pilgaonkar as Jatin (Episode 52)
 Shammi (actress)
 AK Hangal
 Shobha Khotey as Fuffi
 Vrajesh Hirjee
 Amar Upadhyay as Vishal
 Ali Asgar
 Anirudh Agarwal
 Niyati Rajwade
 Feroz

References

External links

Indian comedy television series
Zee TV original programming
1999 Indian television series debuts
2000 Indian television series endings